In convex optimization, a linear matrix inequality (LMI) is an expression of the form
 
where
  is a real vector,
  are  symmetric matrices ,
  is a generalized inequality meaning  is a positive semidefinite matrix belonging to the positive semidefinite cone  in the subspace of symmetric matrices .

This linear matrix inequality specifies a convex constraint on y.

Applications 
There are efficient numerical methods to determine whether an LMI is feasible (e.g., whether there exists a vector y such that LMI(y) ≥ 0), or to solve a convex optimization problem with LMI constraints.
Many optimization problems in control theory, system identification and signal processing can be formulated using LMIs. Also LMIs find application in Polynomial Sum-Of-Squares. The prototypical primal and dual semidefinite program is a minimization of a real linear function respectively subject to the primal and dual convex cones governing this LMI.

Solving LMIs 

A major breakthrough in convex optimization was the introduction of interior-point methods. These methods were developed in a series of papers and became of true interest in the context of LMI problems in the work of Yurii Nesterov and Arkadi Nemirovski.

See also 

 Semidefinite programming
 Spectrahedron
 Finsler's lemma

References 

 Y. Nesterov and A. Nemirovsky, Interior Point Polynomial Methods in Convex Programming. SIAM, 1994.

External links 
 S. Boyd, L. El Ghaoui, E. Feron, and V. Balakrishnan, Linear Matrix Inequalities in System and Control Theory  (book in pdf)
 C. Scherer and S. Weiland, Linear Matrix Inequalities in Control

Convex optimization